"The Pros and Cons of Hitch Hiking", is a song written and performed by Roger Waters from his debut studio album, The Pros and Cons of Hitch Hiking. It was released worldwide on 9 April 1984.

Background
Its meaning consists of the lasting memories of the main character Reg, and displays the benefits and problems associated with his hitchhiking, both figuratively and metaphorically. During the song, Waters mentions such popular icons as Dick Tracy, Shane and Yoko Ono. Waters has said the inclusion of Yoko Ono in the song comes from a dream his drummer Andy Newmark had.

Track listings

Charts

References

External links
The Pros and Cons of Hitch Hiking at Discogs
 Roger Waters official website

1984 debut singles
Roger Waters songs
Songs written by Roger Waters
1984 songs
Harvest Records singles
Columbia Records singles
Hitchhiking